16-Hydroxyestradiol may refer to:

 Estriol (16α-hydroxyestradiol)
 Epiestriol (16β-hydroxyestradiol)